In This Life is the debut studio album by American singer-songwriter Elise Testone, released on February 16, 2014 through Red Tambo Records. The album features backing vocals by Erika Van Pelt.

Track listing

References

2014 debut albums